Kechi Beg railway station 
() is  located in  the Quetta District of Pakistan.

See also
 List of railway stations in Pakistan
 Pakistan Railways

References

External links

Railway stations in Quetta District